Eurométropole de Strasbourg is the métropole, an intercommunal structure, centred on the city of Strasbourg. It is located in the Bas-Rhin department, in the Grand Est region, northeastern France. It was created in January 2015, replacing the previous Communauté urbaine de Strasbourg, and covers that part of the Strasbourg metropolitan area that lies in France. Its area is 337.6 km2. Its population was 511,552 in 2020, of which 290,576 is in Strasbourg proper. The annual budget of the métropole was €1.897 billion in 2020.

History 
The Urban Community of Strasbourg (French: Communauté urbaine de Strasbourg), also known by its French initials CUS, was established in December 1966. It became a métropole on 1 January 2015.

Communes
The 33 communes of the métropole are, with number of inhabitants (population municipale) on 1 January 2020:

Achenheim: 2,437
Bischheim; 17,520
Blaesheim; 1,303
Breuschwickersheim: 1,343
Eckbolsheim; 7,143
Eckwersheim; 1,378
Entzheim; 2,485
Eschau; 5,645
Fegersheim; 5,777
Geispolsheim; 7,603
Hangenbieten: 1,696
Hœnheim; 11,446
Holtzheim; 3,821
Illkirch-Graffenstaden; 27,087
Kolbsheim: 986
Lampertheim; 3,459
Lingolsheim; 19,797
Lipsheim; 2,666
Mittelhausbergen; 2,107
Mundolsheim; 4,911
Niederhausbergen; 1,669
Oberhausbergen; 5,459
Oberschaeffolsheim; 2,438
Osthoffen: 811
Ostwald; 12,985
Plobsheim; 4,475
Reichstett; 4,389
Schiltigheim; 33,993
Souffelweyersheim; 8,057
Strasbourg; 290,576
Vendenheim; 6,010
La Wantzenau; 5,909
Wolfisheim; 4,171

References

External links
Official site

Strasbourg
Geography of Strasbourg
Strasbourg